Thandile Savanna Cordes (born 21 February 1994) is a South African former cricketer who played as a wicket-keeper and right-handed batter. She appeared in two One Day Internationals and two Twenty20 Internationals for South Africa in 2013. She played domestic cricket for Gauteng.

References

External links
 
 

1994 births
Living people
Cricketers from Johannesburg
South African women cricketers
South Africa women One Day International cricketers
South Africa women Twenty20 International cricketers
Central Gauteng women cricketers
Wicket-keepers